Tom Birney is a former placekicker in the National Football League.

Biography
Birney was born Thomas Francis Birney on August 11, 1956 in Bellshill, Scotland.

Career
Birney played with the Green Bay Packers for two seasons. He played at the collegiate level at Michigan State University.
Tom was the final "straight-on" kicker to break into the NFL as a placekicker. Was a high school  track and football coach, in Georgia. Today, he serves as a high school math teacher teaching geometry and pre calculus.

See also
List of Green Bay Packers players

References

1956 births
Living people
Sportspeople from Bellshill
Green Bay Packers players
American football placekickers
Michigan State Spartans football players